Michael Naoum Matsas (b. 1930) is a Holocaust survivor and author. He was born in Ioannina, Greece, and survived the Holocaust by hiding with the Greek resistance.

Works

References

Further reading

Possibly living people
1930 births
People from Ioannina
20th-century Greek people
Greek Jews
Greek emigrants to the United States
American Jews
Greek Holocaust survivors